Hazel de Silva Mugot (born 1947) is a Kenyan writer.

The daughter of a Sri Lankan accountant and a teacher from the Seychelles, she was educated in Kenya and the United States. After her return to Kenya, she worked as a professional model and taught social work at the University of Nairobi.

Selected work 
 Black night of Quiloa, novel (1971)
 Sega of Seychelles, novel (1983)

References 

1947 births
Living people
Kenyan novelists
Kenyan people of Sri Lankan descent
Kenyan women novelists
20th-century Kenyan women writers
20th-century Kenyan writers